Marcus (died 406) was a Roman usurper who was proclaimed emperor in 406 in Roman Britain. He was killed later that same year in a subsequent mutiny.

Career
Marcus was a high ranking soldier in Roman Britain who was proclaimed Emperor by the army there some time in 406, possibly during the summer. Possibly one of the army commanders in Britain (Comes Britanniarum, Comes Litoris Saxonici or Dux Britanniarum), he may have risen to power as a reaction to the increasing raids from abroad at a time when the Empire was withdrawing troops from its distant provinces such as Britain to protect its heartland.

While the historian J. B. Bury conjectured that rebellion of the British legions in 406 was aimed principally at Stilicho, the emperor Honorius’s magister militum, the ancient sources (Olympiodorus of Thebes, Zosimus and Orosius) generally link the rebellion to the barbarian incursions into Gaul and Italy, and specifically the Vandal and Alanic tribes that crossed the Rhine frontier, which Prosper of Aquitaine dated to 31 December 406. The debate for modern historians has therefore centred on whether this event was the trigger for the rebellion. Historians such as N. H. Baynes and M. Kulikowski contend that the rebellion was triggered by the crossing of the Rhine, which should be therefore dated to 31 December 405. However, others such as F. Paschoud and Anthony Birley argue that Prosper’s date is accurate, and that the events in Gaul that sparked the rebellion were related to the barbarians who entered Gaul from Italy, probably a part of the army of Radagaisus, who invaded Italy in 405/6.

Whatever the trigger for the rebellion, all that is known of Marcus’ brief reign is that he did not please the army, so was soon killed by them and replaced with another short-lived usurper, Gratian. Marcus’ death occurred around October 406. Gratian was in turn killed by the troops in early 407, and replaced by Constantine III.

In his pseudohistorical work, the Historia Regum Britanniae, Geoffrey of Monmouth tells of a Gracianus Municeps who takes the throne of Britain away from King Dionotus; it is possible he based these characters on the historical Gratian and Marcus.

He is one of three would-be Emperors described in Alfred Duggan's historic novel The Little Emperors.

Sources

Primary sources
 Zosimus, "Historia Nova", Book 6 Historia Nova

Secondary sources
 Birley, Anthony R., The Roman Government of Britain, Oxford University Press, 2005, 
 Jones, Arnold Hugh Martin, John Robert Martindale, John Morris, The Prosopography of the Later Roman Empire, volume 2, Cambridge University Press, 1992, 
 Bury, J. B., A History of the Later Roman Empire from Arcadius to Irene, Vol. I (1889)

References 

406 deaths
5th-century Roman usurpers
Ancient Romans in Britain
Year of birth unknown